Heliophisma is a genus of moths of the family Noctuidae.

Species
Heliophisma catocalina (Holland, 1894)
Heliophisma klugii (Boisduval, 1833)
Heliophisma xanthoptera (Hampson, 1910)

References
Natural History Museum Lepidoptera genus database

Catocalinae